Carlos Holguín Mallarino (11 June 1832 – 19 October 1894) was a Colombian lawyer, journalist, and politician, who became President of Colombia between 1888 and 1892, acting in the absence of President Rafael Núñez.

Biographic data

Carlos Holguín Mallarino was born on 11 July 1832, in the town of Nóvita, Chocó when the region was still part of the department (state) of Cauca. He died in Bogotá on 19 October 1894 while he was serving in Congress as senator. Carlos Holguín Mallarino was part of the prominent Holguín, Mallarino and Caro Families. Both his uncle Manuel María Mallarino and his brother, Jorge Holguín, were Presidents of Colombia, as was his brother-in-law Miguel Antonio Caro, who succeeded him in office.

Early life
Holguín completed his first years of education in the city of Cali, Valle. He then traveled to Bogotá, where he studied jurisprudence and obtained a degree in law at the Colegio Mayor de San Bartolomé before his 20th birthday. His adoptive grandfather, an Englishman called Paterson Saunders, had taught him Latin, Greek, English, French and Italian. Holguín later became a great orator, debater, and writer. He was also a renowned journalist and professor of literature and history.

Military career 
Holguín enlisted in the army and participated in several military actions like the uprising against President José María Melo, the war against Tomás Cipriano de Mosquera, and the conservative revolt against Aquileo Parra in 1875.

Political career 
After Holguín graduated, he entered the civil service and held a few bureaucratic jobs with the central government. At 23, he was elected as state senator representing the district of buenaventura and thereafter as President of the Cauca State Senate. Later he was elected several times to National Congress, representing the States of Antioquia, Cundinamarca, Tolima and Bolívar. Holguín was appointed also to several ministerial positions such as Minister of Foreign Relations, Interior and War.

In 1881, while in Rome, Holguín was commissioned by President Rafael Núñez to establish diplomatic relations with the Kingdom of Spain. By that time, Colombia was the only Latin American nation that did not have diplomatic relations with Spain. Thus, Holguín was appointed as Special Envoy and plenipotentiary Ambassador of Colombia to the Kingdom of Spain. As head of the diplomatic mission, he arrives in Madrid on 9 January 1881, where he was greeted by the King of Spain, Alfonso XII. For the first time, full diplomatic relations were established between the two nations.

Upon his return to Colombia, on November 1887, Holguín was appointed Minister of Foreign Relations by President Eliseo Payán. Later, President Rafael Núñez appointed him Minister of War.

Presidency  
Carlos Holguín became President of Colombia upon his election by Congress as Presidential Designate, the first time in 1888 and the second time in 1890. Thus, he ruled as president between 1888 and 1892, to complete the six years presidential term of President Rafael Núñez.

During his presidency, Holguín devoted time, energy and resources to the betterment of the nation’s infrastructure, such as the improvement, restoration and development of main highways, railways, shipyards, sea ports, the waterways of the Atrato, Cauca, Magdalena and Nechí rivers, and the electric and telephone grids. He also created and established the “Policia Nacional” (national police).

Holguín was very much disliked and heavily criticized by the opposition party, the liberals, and Congress made it very difficult for him to govern. In his last address to Congress, before he handed over the presidency to Miguel Antonio Caro, he said, "In the four years that I have governed, not a single shot has been fired, not a single drop of blood has been spilled and not a single tear has been shed. I leave the country in peace and I did not incur in further debt."

References

External links 
 
 

1832 births
1894 deaths
People from Chocó Department
Carlos
Mallarino family
19th-century Colombian lawyers
Colombian journalists
Male journalists
Colombian Conservative Party politicians
Presidents of Colombia
Presidential Designates of Colombia
Ambassadors of Colombia to Spain
Magistrates of the Supreme Court of Justice of Colombia
19th-century journalists
19th-century male writers
Colombian people of Spanish descent